Eifort is an unincorporated community in Lawrence and Scioto counties, Ohio, United States.

History
Eifort had its start in the early 1880s when the railroad was extended to that point. The community takes its name from the local Eifort family. A post office called Eifort was established in 1883, and remained in operation until 1952.

References

Unincorporated communities in Lawrence County, Ohio
Unincorporated communities in Scioto County, Ohio
Unincorporated communities in Ohio